Seethanagaram is a village in East Godavari District of the Indian state of Andhra Pradesh. It is the administrative headquarters of Seethanagaram mandal in Rajahmundry revenue division.

Geography
Coordinates: 17°10'31"N   81°41'23"E

References 

Villages in East Godavari district
Visit this Upcoming website for More information.SEETHANAGARAM